The Clock Tower is a landmark in Hong Kong. It is located on the southern shore of Tsim Sha Tsui, Kowloon. It is the only remnant of the original site of the former Kowloon station on the Kowloon–Canton Railway. Officially named Former Kowloon-Canton Railway Clock Tower, it is usually referred to as the Tsim Sha Tsui Clock Tower for its location.

Built out of red bricks and granite, the Clock Tower peaks at 44 metres, and is topped by a 7-metre lightning rod. The top of the tower can be reached by a wooden staircase located within. The interior of Clock Tower had previously been open for the visit but is currently closed for maintenance. The clock tower is located near Victoria Harbour at the foot of Salisbury Road. Another landmark, the Tsim Sha Tsui Ferry Pier, is located nearby.

The tower has been listed as a declared monument in Hong Kong since 1990.

History

The plan of Kowloon-Canton Railway was realised in 1904 with its terminus in Tsim Sha Tsui. The terminus design was assigned to A. B. Hubback due, in part, to his experiences in designing Railway Terminus in the Straits Settlements, Malaya. The Kowloon-Canton Railway was inaugurated on 1 October 1910; however, construction of the station did not begin until 1913. A temporary station was used while the best site for the location of the station was determined, and work on sea walls and site formation on reclaimed land was completed. The onset of the First World War also resulted in delivery of materials required for the building being delayed, and construction was halted for some time. Part of the station, including the Clock Tower, was completed in 1915, and the whole station was opened on 28 March 1916.

The Clock Tower reused the clock from the demolished Pedder Street Clock Tower. However, only one side had a clock, and it was not until 1920 that the remaining three sides of the Clock Tower were installed. They began operation on the afternoon of 22 March 1921, and have run ever since except during the Japanese occupation of Hong Kong during World War II. During the fighting before the occupation, the clock tower building sustained damage, leaving the marks of combat present to this day.

Following the liberation of Hong Kong, the clock was reactivated on 2 October 1945. The use of the clock tower's bell was discontinued in 1950 after four separate motors were installed, once for each face of the clock – meaning the times shown on each side of the tower were slightly different.

In 1975, Kowloon station was moved to the present-day Hung Hom station on the newly reclaimed Hung Hom Bay. The station building was demolished in 1977 despite the protest and petitioning from the Heritage Society and other pressure groups. However, as a compromise, it was decided that the Clock Tower was to be preserved, and it is now accompanied by the Hong Kong Space Museum, Hong Kong Museum of Art and Hong Kong Cultural Centre, all built on former station grounds.

On 13 July 1990, the tower was gazetted as a declared monument under the Antiquities and Monuments Ordinance.

The bell inside the Clock Tower was on display in Sha Tin station from the mid-1980s to 1995 and was moved to the KCRC Office in Fo Tan from 1995 to the early 2000s. Finally, the government moved the bell inside the Clock Tower in 2010.

On 9 December 2021, the use of the clock tower's bell chimes was resumed. From this point, the bell will ring hourly between 8am to midnight. It reports the time via a digital bell system synchronised with the web clock of the Hong Kong Observatory.

Gallery

See also
 List of buildings and structures in Hong Kong

References

External links

An introduction by Antiquities and Monuments Office
A visual history of the Tsim Sha Tsui Clock Tower

 Towers completed in 1915
 Declared monuments of Hong Kong
 Landmarks in Hong Kong
 Kowloon–Canton Railway
 Tsim Sha Tsui
 Tourist attractions in Hong Kong
 Clock towers in China